Hysterie is a compilation album by American singer-songwriter Lydia Lunch, released in 1986 by record label Widowspeak.

Track listing

Personnel 
Birrer – photography
Gary Hobish – mastering
Lydia Lunch – vocals

Charts

References

External links 
 

1986 compilation albums
Lydia Lunch albums
Teenage Jesus and the Jerks albums